The El Salvador women's Under 20's football team, is controlled by Federación Salvadoreña de Fútbol and represents El Salvador in international women's Under 20 or youth football competitions.

Coaches
 José Ricardo Herrera (2006)
 Eric Acuna (2021-present)

See also
 El Salvador women's national football team
 Federación Salvadoreña de Fútbol

External links
 http://www.fesfut.org.sv/seleccion_info.php?id_seleccion=81

under
Central American women's national under-20 association football teams
El Salvador
Women's national under-20 association football teams